Hohokam Stadium (previously spelled HoHoKam), also known as Dwight W. Patterson Field and formerly Hohokam Park (1997–2013), is a 10,500-seat baseball park located in Mesa, Arizona. The stadium, named for the Hohokam people who occupied the region from approximately AD 1 to the mid-15th century, was completed in January 1997 after the original Hohokam Stadium was demolished. In 2015, it became the spring training home of Major League Baseball's Oakland Athletics.  The 2015 stadium and facility refresh was led by Populous.

History
From 1997 to 2013, the stadium was the spring training home of the Chicago Cubs. In 1999, the Cubs drew 171,681 fans for its 15 home games, an average of 11,445 people per game. In 2007, the Cubs established a then Cactus League single-game attendance record of 12,906. In 2009, the Cubs established a then Major League Baseball and Cactus League single-season attendance record of 203,105 in 19 home games with an average per game attendance of 10,690—leading all MLB teams. Seven games had average attendance of over 13,000.

In 2002, the Arizona State University baseball team called Hohokam Park home while the on-campus Packard Stadium was being renovated.

The stadium hosted the 2010, 2011, 2012 and 2015 Western Athletic Conference baseball tournaments and will host the 2016 WAC Tournament.

The Chicago Cubs continued using the stadium until the completion of Sloan Park for the 2014 spring training season. That same season, Oakland Athletics took over operations of Hohokam Stadium for their spring training activities, and continue to use it to this day.

Hohokam Stadium (1976–1996)
The original Hohokam Stadium was built in 1976 just east of the site of the current stadium. It was known as Hohokam Stadium from 1976 to 1995 and Hohokam Park in 1996. The stadium also became known as Dwight W. Patterson Field in 1991 with the name carrying over to the new stadium when it was built in 1997.

From 1977 to 1978, it was the spring training home of Major League Baseball's Oakland Athletics. From 1979 to 1996, the Chicago Cubs used the stadium as their spring training home until the stadium was demolished in 1996 and replaced with the current stadium in 1997. The Cubs set a number of spring training attendance records while they played in the stadium during the 1980s, frequently drawing over 100,000 fans over a single month of play.

The stadium began selling beer at the games in 1989.

References

External links

 Official site
 Mesa Hohokams
 Ballpark Reviews: HoHoKam Park

Arizona Fall League
Cactus League venues
Chicago Cubs spring training venues
Minor league baseball venues
Oakland Athletics spring training venues
Sports in Mesa, Arizona
Sports venues in Maricopa County, Arizona
1997 establishments in Arizona
Sports venues completed in 1997
Sports venues demolished in 1996